Dunlo is an unincorporated community and census-designated place (CDP) in Adams Township, Cambria County, Pennsylvania, United States.  It is located between the communities of Beaverdale and Salix, in the valley of Sulphur Creek, a tributary of the Little Conemaugh River. As of the 2010 census, the population was 342 residents.

Demographics

References

Census-designated places in Cambria County, Pennsylvania
Census-designated places in Pennsylvania